Jagoba Beobide Larrañaga (born 19 February 1987) is a Spanish professional footballer who plays for Real Unión as a midfielder.

Club career
Born in Azpeitia, Gipuzkoa, Beobide spent his first three seasons as a senior in the Segunda División B, with Real Sociedad B and Real Unión. He achieved promotion with the latter club at the end of 2008–09, contributing 27 matches to the feat.

Beobide made his professional debut in the Segunda División on 12 September 2009, coming on as a second-half substitute in the 1–1 home draw against FC Cartagena. He added a further 32 appearances during the campaign, which ended in immediate relegation.

In the summer of 2010, Beobide signed a one-year contract with fellow league side Córdoba CF. He returned to the third division one year later, going on to represent Real Unión and Deportivo Alavés and achieving another promotion as starter.

Beobide scored the first of only three career league goals on 3 November 2013, in a 2–2 home draw with CD Tenerife. He started 2014–15 on the sidelines due to an abdominal injury, and thus featured sparingly under Alberto López. He won his second promotion with the Basques in the 2015–16 season, playing 16 games for the champions in the process.

Beobide competed in the third tier the following years, at the service of Racing de Santander and Burgos CF. On 30 July 2019 the 32-year-old moved abroad for the first time in his career, agreeing to a deal at Rovaniemen Palloseura of the Finnish Veikkausliiga.

On 23 January 2020, Beobide returned to Real Unión for a third spell.

Honours
Alavés
Segunda División: 2015–16
Segunda División B: 2012–13

References

External links
 
 
 
 
 

1987 births
Living people
People from Azpeitia
Sportspeople from Gipuzkoa
Spanish footballers
Footballers from the Basque Country (autonomous community)
Association football midfielders
Segunda División players
Segunda División B players
Primera Federación players
Real Sociedad B footballers
Real Unión footballers
Córdoba CF players
Deportivo Alavés players
Racing de Santander players
Burgos CF footballers
Veikkausliiga players
Rovaniemen Palloseura players
Spanish expatriate footballers
Expatriate footballers in Finland
Spanish expatriate sportspeople in Finland